Hennenkobel is a mountain near Zwiesel, in Bavaria, Germany.

References

Mountains of Bavaria